Chris Templeman (born 11 September 1980 in Kirkcaldy) is a Scottish former footballer who played as a striker. He played for several Scottish Football League sides, spending 7 years with Forfar Athletic as well as making appearances in the Scottish Premier League for Dunfermline Athletic.

Career

Dunfermline Athletic
His career started with Dunfermline Athletic, the club he supported as a boy, and, while there, he spent time on loan at Dumbarton and Stirling Albion.

Brechin City
After signing for Brechin City on a permanent basis he was instrumental in guiding them to the Scottish Football League First Division in season 2002–03.

Greenock Morton
Greenock Morton then paid a "considerable fee" to sign him.

After a poor start at Cappielow, punctuated by a return to Brechin City on loan, Templeman became a regular starter and important player at Cappielow, his most famous goals probably being his double against SPL side Kilmarnock in the Scottish Cup Third Round, where Morton won 3–1. However, by the start of the 2007–08 season, with Morton having won promotion to the First Division, Templeman's playing time began to decrease, largely in favour of Peter Weatherson and Iain Russell. He came on frequently as a substitute in the second half, notching up three goals in cup competitions.

East Fife
On 17 January 2008, it was announced that Sanny would be moving to East Fife. It was not announced if a transfer fee was paid. However, by 21 January he was an East Fife player.

Forfar Athletic
In June 2009, Templeman joined Forfar Athletic after being released by East Fife. After 7 years and over 250 appearances for the Loons, Templeman was released by Forfar in January 2016, signing for Scottish League Two side Montrose shortly after leaving Station Park.

Montrose
Templeman spent 2 and a half years with Montrose, before announcing his retirement in May 2018.

Crossgates Primrose
After a year out, Templeman returned to the game with Junior Fife club Crossgates Primrose where he played for one season before once again retiring.

Career statistics

Honours

Greenock Morton

 Scottish Football League Second Division: 1
 2006–07

Brechin City

 Scottish Football League Third Division: 1
 2001–02

Montrose

Scottish League Two: 1
 2017-18

References

External links

Living people
1980 births
Footballers from Kirkcaldy
Scottish footballers
Dunfermline Athletic F.C. players
Dumbarton F.C. players
Stirling Albion F.C. players
Brechin City F.C. players
East Fife F.C. players
Greenock Morton F.C. players
Scottish Premier League players
Scottish Football League players
Forfar Athletic F.C. players
Montrose F.C. players
Association football forwards
Scottish Junior Football Association players
Crossgates Primrose F.C. players